Dionísio is a municipality in the state of Minas Gerais, Brazil. The city belongs to the mesoregion Metropolitana de Belo Horizonte and to the microregion of Itabira.  As of 2020, the estimated population was 7,609.

The municipality contains part of the  Rio Doce State Park, created in 1944, the first state-level conservation unit in Minas Gerais.

See also
 List of municipalities in Minas Gerais

References

Municipalities in Minas Gerais